Huayna Picchu, is a mountain in Peru around which the Urubamba River bends. It is located in the Cusco Region, Urubamba Province, Machupicchu District. It rises over Machu Picchu, the so-called lost city of the Incas. The Incas built a trail up the side of the Huayna Picchu and built temples and terraces on its top.

According to local guides, the top of the mountain was the residence for the high priest and the local virgins. Every morning before sunrise, the high priest with a small group would walk to Machu Picchu to signal the coming of the new day. The Temple of the Moon, one of the three major temples in the Machu Picchu area, is nestled on the side of the mountain and is situated at an elevation lower than Machu Picchu. Adjacent to the Temple of the Moon is the Great Cavern, another sacred temple with fine masonry. The other major local temples in Machu Picchu are the Temple of the Condor, Temple of Three Windows, Principal Temple, "Unfinished Temple", and the Temple of the Sun, also called the Torreon.

Its name is Hispanicized, possibly from the Quechua, alternative spelling Wayna Pikchu; wayna young, young man, pikchu pyramid, mountain or prominence with a broad base which ends in sharp peaks, "young peak". The current Quechua orthography used by the Ministerio de Cultura is Waynapicchu and Machupicchu.

Tourism
Huayna Picchu may be visited throughout the year, but the number of daily visitors allowed on Huayna Picchu is restricted to 400. There are two times that visitors may enter the Huayna Picchu Trail; entrance between 7:00–8:00 AM and another from 10:00–11:00 AM. The 400 permitted hikers are split evenly between the two entrance times.

A steep and, at times, exposed pathway leads to the summit. Some portions are slippery and steel cables (a via ferrata) provide some support during the one-hour climb. The ascent is more challenging between November and April because the path up the mountain becomes slippery in the rainy season. Better conditions for climbing can be expected during the dry season, which runs from May to September. There are two trails in varying length that visitors can take to hike to the summit. The shorter trail takes approximately 45–60 minutes to reach the top, while the longer trail takes approximately 3 hours to reach the summit.

From the summit, a second trail leads down to the Gran Caverna and what is known as the Temple of the Moon.  These natural caves, on the northern face of the mountain, are lower than the starting point of the trail. The return path from the caves completes a loop around the mountain where it rejoins the main trail.

In popular culture

 Aguirre, the Wrath of God (1972) was filmed partly on the stone stairway of Huayna Picchu. 
In the Hulu series, The Path, a core belief of the fictional Meyerism movement is that Dr. Stephen Meyer climbed the ladder of burning light atop Huayna Picchu.

See also

 Putucusi

References

Inca
Ruins in Peru
Mountains of Peru
Mountains of Cusco Region
Archaeological sites in Cusco Region
Archaeological sites in Peru
Tourist attractions in Cusco Region
Climbing areas of Peru